Kurt Julius Sterneck (28 June 1919 – 23 January 1998) was an Austro-German stage and film actor, radio drama narrator and director.

Life 
Born in Graz, Sterneck was the son of the opera singer Berthold Sterneck (1887–1943) and his first wife Ernestine Franziska Sterneck, née Schröder. The Jewish father and Catholic mother had converted to Protestantism shortly before the marriage in 1918. As the mother died already in September 1919, her son initially grew up with relatives of his mother in Graz. The father married again in 1922 and took the son to live with him in Munich in 1923.

After passing his Abitur from a Realgymnasium in Munich in 1937, he initially worked as a trainee in preparation for studying engineering. In 1938, Sterneck entered military service and later participated in World War II as a soldier. In 1943, he began studying engineering at the Technical University of Munich. In 1944, he was arrested because of his Jewish origins. After stays in the Dachau concentration camp and a forced labour camp, Sterneck continued his interrupted studies after the end of the war in 1945 and successfully completed them. In addition to his profession as an engineer, he took acting lessons with Anna Zeise-Ernst and Heinz Thiele from 1949.

Sterneck made his debut in Munich in 1951. From autumn 1955, he was a member of the ensemble at the Theater Krefeld und Mönchengladbach. Stints at theatres in Pforzheim, Augsburg, Innsbruck and Tübingen followed. In 1991, a performance is planned in the Stuttgart Komödie im Marquardt in the play Trautes Heim – nie allein by Anthony Marriott and Bob Grant zu verzeichnen. In the 1993/1994 season, he embodied his last stage role in Hermann Bahr's The Concert at the Komödie im Bayerischen Hof in Munich.

Sterneck took part in several television productions. He also worked frequently as a radio play narrator and directed several radio dramas. For example, he appeared in Andreas Okopenko's radio drama Johanna.

Sterneck continued to teach at the University of Music and Performing Arts Graz.

Sterneck died in Munich at the age of 78.

Filmography 
 1963: Die Fernfahrer (TV series) – Frachtbrief Nr. 1012
 1965: Zeitsperre (TV film)
 1966: Zehn Prozent (TV film)
 1967: Blick von der Brücke (TV film)
 1972–1976: Die Abenteuer des braven Soldaten Schwejk (TV series) – 1 sequel
 1984: Derrick (TV series) – Angriff aus dem Dunkel

Radio play

Narrator 
 1961: Spiel auf der Tenne
 1962: Die einzige Rechnung (Folge aus dem Mehrteiler „Terra Incognita“)
 1968: Fast eine Reportage
 1969: Johanna
 1963: Gesucht wird Jimmy Hardwick
 1964: Das Fenster
 1964: Der fahrende Schüler im Paradies
 1964: Jobal und die vier Reiter
 1965: Solo für Störtebeker
 1967: Das gefleckte Band
 1967: Der Mann mit den zwei Bärten 1967: Ein Leben 1968: Der Sonntag der braven Leute 1968: Geheimakt ADM 20 C auf der Kinderspielwiese (8 sequels)
 1968: Mord im Erholungsdorf (8 szequels)
 1968: Alles für Septimius Severus 1968: Die Stimme unter der Brücke 1968: Hier darf nur geflogen werden 1969: Der Große Rindfleisch-Vertrag 1969: Korsakow 1969: Die Partei der Anständigen 1969: Das Mädchen am Fenster 1969: Mauer 1969: Frau Kröner fährt Taxi 1970: Ausbruch 1970: Der Käfig 1970: Die Rückkehr des Cortez 1971: Auslandsgespräch 1971: Der Aufstand der Würmer 1971: Der Tod der Bessie Smith 1971: Die blaue Küste 1971: Goll Moll 1971: Ferngespräche 1971: Die heißen Tage der Gerti Zeiss 1972: Beschreibungen 1972: Miteinander, Füreinander 1972: Johanna oder Ein Familienzwist 1973: Das Lächeln der Apostel 1973: Der Mann, der seine persönliche Meinung verloren hat 1974: Eins, zwei, drei 1975: Der schwarze Tod 1975: Große Oper für Stanislaw den Schweiger 1977: Paß nach Drüben 1978: Ein Hund namens Hegel Direction 
 1972: Der Pfründner 1972: Der Mensch Adam Deigl und die Obrigkeit 1973: Menschenkuchen 1973: Der Verderber 1973: Die Schreibmaschinen 1973: Erdbeereis mit Schlagobers 1973: Lieferung frei Haus 1974: Sprechstunde bei Dr. Weiss 1975: Einfach Anna 1977: Hecht im Karpfenteich 1980: Männlicher gegen Maschine Further reading
 , Hans Joachim Moser (ed.): Kürschners biographisches Theater-Handbuch. Schauspiel, Oper, Film, Rundfunk. Deutschland, Österreich, Schweiz. De Gruyter, Berlin 1956, .
 Bernhard Möllmann: Der Opernsänger Berthold Sterneck und seine Familie. In Bernhard Schoßig (ed.): Ins Licht gerückt. Jüdische Lebenswege im Münchner Westen. Eine Spurensuche in Pasing, Obermenzing und Aubing. Ein Werkstattbuch.'' Herbert-Utz-Verlag, München 2008, .

References

External links 
 
 

German male stage actors
German male film actors
Audiobook narrators
Dachau concentration camp survivors
1919 births
1998 deaths
Actors from Graz
German military personnel of World War II
Jewish German actors